The Journal of Physical Chemistry B is a peer-reviewed scientific journal that covers research on several fields of material chemistry (macromolecules, soft matter, and surfactants) as well as statistical mechanics, thermodynamics, and biophysical chemistry.  It has been published weekly since 1997 by the American Chemical Society. According to the Journal Citation Reports, the journal had an impact factor of 3.466 for 2021.

Due to the growing amount of research in the fields it covers, the journal was split into two at the beginning of 2007, with The Journal of Physical Chemistry C specializing in nanostructures, the structures and properties of surfaces and interfaces, electronics, and related topics.

List of editors-in-chief 
The following persons have been editor-in-chief:
 1997–2005 Mostafa El-Sayed
 2005–2019 George C. Schatz
 2020–Present Joan-Emma Shea

See also 
 The Journal of Physical Chemistry A
 The Journal of Physical Chemistry C
 The Journal of Physical Chemistry Letters

External links

References 

American Chemical Society academic journals
Weekly journals
English-language journals
Publications established in 1997
Physical chemistry journals